Roman Friedli (born 13 March 1979 in Kathmandu, Nepal) is a Swiss retired professional footballer who last played for FC Köniz.

Friedli previously played in the Swiss Super League for Neuchâtel Xamax, Yverdon-Sport, FC Aarau and BSC Young Boys.

He joined FC Thun on 22 January 2006.

References

1979 births
Living people
Swiss men's footballers
Switzerland under-21 international footballers
Swiss Super League players
Neuchâtel Xamax FCS players
BSC Young Boys players
Yverdon-Sport FC players
FC Thun players
FC Aarau players
Association football midfielders
Sportspeople from Kathmandu
Nepalese people of Swiss descent